Mujuthaaz Mohamed (born 25 October 1992), known as Mujey is a Maldivian professional footballer who plays as a left back for Maziya.

Career
Mujuthaaz started his career at Club Valencia before joining Club Eagles in 2015.

Before moving to Maziya in 2018, Mujuthaaz was loaned out to Club Valencia with Ahmed Nashid and Sujan Perera for the 2017 Maldives FA Cup since Club Eagles failed to qualify for the 2017 Dhivehi Premier League, finishing 2017 Malé League at 5th on table. However, Club Valencia later withdrew their participation in the tournament.

International
Mujuthaaz's first international experience was the 2014 Asian games where the Maldives under-23 side were eliminated from the group stage.

He had a handful of Maldives senior side call-ups on different occasions but failed to make it through to the final squad. On 23 March 2018, he played his first senior international game in a friendly against Singapore during Maldives' training camp in Singapore to prepare for the 2018 SAFF Championship. 

On 27 March 2018, Mujuthaaz played his first competitive game for Maldives, in the 7-0 home win over Bhutan in the last group stage match of 2018 FIFA World Cup qualification second round.

He received his call-up for the final 2018 SAFF Championship squad and played in both group stage matches against Sri Lanka and India. Maldives went on to win the SAFF Championship for the second time that year.

Honours
Club Eagles
President's Cup: 2016

Maziya
Dhivehi Premier League: 2019–20

Maldives
SAFF Championship: 2018

References

External links
 
 Mujey

1992 births
Living people
Maldivian footballers
Association football midfielders
Maldives international footballers
Club Valencia players
Maziya S&RC players
Footballers at the 2014 Asian Games
Asian Games competitors for the Maldives
Club Eagles players